Saint-Laurent is a provincial electoral district in the Montreal region of Quebec, Canada that elects members to the National Assembly of Quebec. It comprises part of the Ahuntsic-Cartierville borough and part of the Saint-Laurent borough of Montreal.

It was created for the 1966 election from parts of Jacques-Cartier and Laval electoral districts.

In the change from the 2001 to the 2011 electoral map, its territory was unchanged.

Members of the Legislative Assembly / National Assembly

Election results

* Result compared to Action démocratique

* Result compared to UFP

References

External links
Information
 Elections Quebec

Election results
 Election results (National Assembly)
 Election results (QuébecPolitique)

Maps
 2011 map (PDF)
 2001 map (Flash)
2001–2011 changes (Flash)
1992–2001 changes (Flash)
 Electoral map of Montreal region 
 Quebec electoral map, 2011 

Provincial electoral districts of Montreal
Quebec provincial electoral districts
Ahuntsic-Cartierville
Saint-Laurent, Quebec